Brancepeth Station is a large, historically significant agricultural station in the Wairarapa, New Zealand.

The largest building on the property is a 36-room farmhouse. Other buildings still standing include the original whare (built in 1865), the first homestead (1858), a woolshed (1858), a coach house and stables, station school and the library (1884).

Victoria University of Wellington now holds all the books which were previously in the Brancepeth Library. Professor Lydia Wevers said "Going into the Brancepeth Station Library was like suddenly being in the 19th century, for someone had literally walked out the door 100 years ago and left it there".

Heritage New Zealand has designated Brancepeth as a Category 1 historic place.

References

External links 
 NZ History information
 Heritage NZ information
 Masterton Library page

Wairarapa
Hill Country stations
Heritage New Zealand Category 1 historic places in the Wellington Region